Čačak is a city and the administrative center of the Moravica District in central Serbia. It is located in the West Morava Valley within the geographical region of Šumadija. As of the 2022 census, the city within administrative borders has a population of 106,453 inhabitants.

The city lies about 144 km south of the Serbian capital, Belgrade. It is also located near the Ovčar-Kablar Gorge ("Serbian Mount Athos"), with over 30 monasteries built in the gorge since the 14th century.

Geography
Čačak is located in the western part of central Serbia, within the region of Šumadija. Once densely forested, the region is today characterized by its rolling hills and its fruit trees. To the south, past the Ovčar-Kablar Gorge, lie the mountains of the Dinaric Alps. These mountains incline in a gentle and wavy way toward the Čačak valley and the West Morava River.

 the Čačak valley, with an altitude between 
 the mountains Jelica to the south, Vujan to the northeast, and Ovčar and Kablar to the west

Climate
Čačak has an oceanic climate (Köppen climate classification: Cfb) bordering on a humid continental climate (Köppen climate classification: Dfb). Winds blow from the north and northeast and rarely from the west because of the mountains that block them. There are on average 38 days with snow during the year. The usual number of foggy days is 54.

There are a few recorded instances of sandstorms originating in the Sahara arriving to the town.

History

Etymology

The original name of the town was Gradac (meaning "little town"), which developed around the Moravski Gradac monastery, built in the late 12th century. First mention of the name Čačak was in a document issued by the Republic of Ragusa. Dated on 3 January 1409, it refers to the events from 18 December 1408, and this date is today the official Čačak Town Day.

The origin of the name is obscured today. However, several dictionaries from the 19th and even from the 20th century, including works of major linguists Vuk Stefanović Karadžić and Đuro Daničić, mention words čačak and the corresponding adjective čačkovit, meaning (lumps of) frozen or dried mud, or lumps of stone protruding from the ground. The widening along the West Morava where Čačak is located, was indeed regularly flooded until the 20th century. Daničić suggested that the origin of the word is the root skak (skakati means jumping in Serbian). The word and its variants completely disappeared from Serbian language today, but some other toponymy of the same origin were preserved, like in the name of the  mountain.

In time, erroneous but widespread theory developed, claiming that the name indeed means "mud", but that it is of Turkish origin. At the time of the name's first mention this region wasn't occupied by the Ottoman Empire yet, mud is called differently in Turkish language, nor there is a Turkish word corresponding vocally to čačak.

Prehistoric

The region has several archaeological sites, dating from prehistory to the present, the oldest from the 15th century BC.

Princely tombs of an Illyrian type (Glasinac culture) were found in two mounds of Atenica with Ionian glass, glass-paste, an amber bead depicting a swan, and an Attic plaque of a wild boar, all dating to the late 6th century BC. More ornithomorphic fibulae of bronze swans were found in Mojsinje.

Prehistoric tumuli have been unearthed in Mrčajevci. The Triballi and Scordisci tribes lived in this area by the time of Roman conquest.

Roman era

The town was inhabited in Roman times, with traces of the Roman settlement still visible today, like Roman Thermae built in the 2nd to 4th century period. These still stand behind a secondary school in the center of Čačak.

Nearby, in the village of Gradina at the foot of the Jelica mountain, a Roman compound (fort) with a martyrium and necropolis has been excavated, with three churches, one of which produced a
pentanummion for the late Roman Emperor Justinian in the 526–537 period. Justinian is also believed to have founded the fort in the 530s. The presence of burnt layers on the sight could be evidence that the settlement was destroyed in the conflict that characterized the region following the barbarian invasions of the late Roman Empire. In the same region, in the 6th century, four other forts were built.

Middle Ages
Slavs settled the area during the reign of the Byzantine Emperor Heraclius (610–641).  From 1168 to 1189, after incorporation into the First Bulgarian Empire and then various Serbian states, Stefan Nemanja's brother Stracimir Zavidović controlled the West Morava region, including the city, then known as Gradac. Stracimir, a Serbian župan, raised the Church of Our Lady of Moravian Gradac at the highest point of the town.

In 1459, the Turks completed their conquest of the area, incorporating it into the Sanjak of Smederevo and converting Stracimir's church into a mosque. The town's name was changed from Gradac to the current Čačak.

16th century–present
Evliya Çelebi, an Ottoman explorer of the 16th and 17th centuries, described Čačak as the main place in the local kadiluk. In 1717, Čačak became a part of the Habsburg Empire after the Austrians defeated Ottomans, signing the Treaty of Passarowitz. Austrian rule was short-lived, and 21 years later Čačak would again became a part of the Ottoman Empire. Most of Čačak's Serb residents at the time of reconquest had deserted the town, migrating north safety in the Habsburg Empire. In their stead were settlers from Montenegro, Bosnia and Hercegovina and Vlachs from the countryside nearby.

Čačak has two years on its coat of arms. The first is 1408, in which Ragusan archives first name the town. The second is 1815, the year the Second Serbian Uprising began and the year the Battle of Ljubić was fought in the hills near Čačak. This battle is famous for one of the greatest Serbian rebel victories. Then a small group, the rebels defeated a much stronger Ottoman army numbering 5,000–12,000 men. Soon after, the Principality of Serbia, one of the first nations liberated from Ottoman rule, secured its independence.

In 1837, one of the first Serbian grammar schools was completed. In the 1837–1941 period Čačak gradually modernized, with its town center modeled in a Vienna Secession style popular at the time and standing to this day. During World War II, Čačak was part of the short-lived Republic of Užice, which, while the first liberated territory in Europe, was cut off by German forces shortly after it was founded. On 4 December 1944 Čačak was finally liberated by the Yugoslav Partisans. It has since evolved into a large town and a regional center, later being given the official status of a city within today's Republic of Serbia.

Settlements
Aside from the urban area of the city, the administrative area includes the following 58 settlements:

 Atenica
 Baluga (Ljubićska)
 Baluga (Trnavska)
 Banjica
 Beljina
 Bečanj
 Brezovica
 Bresnica
 Vapa
 Vidova
 Viljuša
 Vranići
 Vrnčani
 Vujetinci
 Goričani
 Gornja Gorevnica
 Gornja Trepča
 Donja Gorevnica
 Donja Trepča
 Žaočani
 Zablaće
 Jančići
 Ježevica
 Jezdina
 Katrga
 Kačulice
 Konjevići
 Kukići
 Kulinovci
 Lipnica
 Loznica
 Ljubić
 Međuvršje
 Milićevci
 Miokovci
 Mojsinje
 Mrčajevci
 Mršinci
 Ovčar Banja
 Ostra
 Pakovraće
 Parmenac
 Petnica
 Preljina
 Premeća
 Pridvorica
 Prijevor
 Prislonica
 Rajac
 Rakova
 Riđage
 Rošci
 Slatina
 Sokolići
 Stančići
 Trbušani
 Trnava

Demographics

As of 2011 census, the city's administrative area or municipality has 115,337 inhabitants, with 73,331 living in Čačak proper. As of 2022 census, the city within administrative borders has a population of 106,453 inhabitants.

The city of Čačak has 38,590 households with 2.99 members on average. The number of homes is 51,482.

The city's religious structure is predominantly Serbian Orthodox (110,281), with minorities including atheists (577), Catholics (168), Muslims (73), Protestants (21) and others. Virtually the entire population speaks the Serbian language (112,505).

The composition of population by gender and average age:
 Male – 55,995 (41.42 years) and
 Female – 59,342 (43.95 years).

A total of 53,543 citizens older than 15 have a secondary education (54.01%), while 14,823 citizens have some sort of tertiary education (14.95%). Of those with a tertiary education, 9,386 (9.47%) have university education.

Ethnic groups
The city is mostly inhabited by Serbs (95.3%), followed by minorities of Roma, Montenegrins and other ethnic groups.

Being located on a crossroads between the Ottoman Empire and Austria-Hungary during the 19th century, Čačak was home even to people of ethnicities that were not common in Čačak's region. One such example was a small Armenian community which began to settle from 1885, fleeing the forcible draft into the Ottoman army and the general oppression against the Armenians in the empire. Most members of this community worked in the coffee business. By the 1950s most of them had emigrated as the new Communist authorities, in the massive process of nationalization after World War II, confiscated Armenian businesses.

The ethnic composition of the city is given in the following table (as of 2011 census):

Society and culture

This city traversed a long and thorny road from an anonymous settlement to a modern city in the 21st century. The very face of the city, as seen in the facades, monuments, and cultural establishments, is the reflection of the artistic spirit of its inhabitants.

During the theatrical season there are numerous theatrical ensembles on tour from all of Serbia at cultural centre Dom kulture Čačak. Centre is home to "Drama Studio" and schools of ballet, fine art and sculpture. The exhibitions and performances, cultural and literary evenings are held at numerous places such as: "City Library Čačak", "Nadežda Petrović" and "Risim" galleries, "National Museum" in Čačak, "Salon of Photography" and "Inter-Municipal Archive" among many others. The current artwork production in the city can be followed through the auspices of groups and associations, private galleries, colonies and numerous enthusiasts.

Fine art and sculpture colonies are most often held at the Ovčar Banja spa resort. There are numerous cultural, musical, entertainment and tourist manifestations within the city and close surroundings, which attract multitudes of followers of ethno-culture, original folk music, like the "Dis spring", Memorial to Nadežda Petrović and the "Flute festival" in the nearby village of Prislonica. Also, newly established festivals "DUK Festival" and rock festival "Priča" attract younger population from the city and its region. Čačak is also home to events such as "Pitijada", "Kupusijada", "Fijakerijada" and other festivals that celebrate old traditions belonging to Serbs.

Education
There are two faculties located in Čačak, which are a part of the University of Kragujevac:
 Faculty of Agronomy
 Faculty of Technical Sciences

There are seven secondary schools:
 Čačak's Grammar School (one of the oldest grammar schools in Serbia, 1837)
 High School of Economics
 Technical High School
 Medicine High School
 Machine High School
 Musical High School
 F&C School

There are many primary schools and childcare centers.

Sports

The "Mladost Sports Center" which is located on the coast of West Morava River, next to the Čačak Stadium, two faculties and numerous other important buildings, offers many sports venues for locals. The whole area where the Sports Center is located is the town's most important entertainment area.

Čačak is nationally famous for its clubs in various team sports; the most popular ones are basketball, football and handball. The basketball club Borac Čačak and football club Borac Čačak have been participating in the top-tier leagues of Serbia for many consecutive years with much success. Women's handball is also very successful and popular.

Tourism
In the vicinity of Čačak there are more than 20 churches and monasteries, the largest number found on such a small area in Serbia. They represent cultural and historic monuments of great significance. The most important ones are the Church of the Ascension of Jesus, a church on Ljubić hill dedicated to Saint Tsar Lazar, as well as the Vujan Monastery located on a nearby mountain of the same name. Special value is attributed to the monasteries of the Ovčar-Kablar Gorge, which as a cultural and historic whole date back to the Middle Ages and represent the particularity of the region's cultural and artistic heritage created over the centuries. There are 12 monasteries and churches in the gorge:
 Uspenje
 Vavedenje
 Jovanje
 Nikolje
 Blagoveštenje
 Vaznesenje
 Preobraženje
 Sretenje
 Sveta Trojica
 Ilinje
 Savinje
 Kadjenica

Thermal and mineral springs with medicinal properties provide the basis for the development of recreational tourism. There are three spa resorts within the territory of the city of Čačak: Gornja Trepča, Ovčar Banja and Slatinska Banja. There are also picnic sites: Gradina and the "Battle and victory" park (also called "Spomen" (remembrance) park) on the Jelica mountain, the Memorial complex on Ljubić hill, Grujine fields, rafts on West Morava river in Beljina, Parmenac, Međuvršje and Ovčar Banja, and picnic sites on the tiny rivers called Dičina, Kamenica, Čemernica and Banja.

Image gallery

Economy

The structure of the economy of the city of Čačak is composed of services and trade, industry and agriculture. The main processing industries are paper production, electric home appliances, blade tools for the processing of metal, non-metals, chemical industry products, thermal technical appliances, metal and combined carpentry, parts and kits for the pharmaceutical industry and products for medical needs. Also, well developed are wood, lumber industry and agriculture.

Many companies with more than 250 employees have deteriorated due to the sanctions in the 1990s. Since 2000, more than 40 government-owned companies have gone through the privatization process.

Private enterprise, which has its tradition from back in the 19th century, is the primary characteristic of the economy of the city. As of January 2017, 98.65% of all business enterprises are small and micro companies. A large number of private companies grew into middle-size companies with 80 to 270 employees offering a wide variety of products. Today, on the territory of the city of Čačak, among the largest employers are Sloboda, Technical Overhaul Military Institute (Remont), Hospital Čačak, Fabrika reznog alata and P.S. Fashion. Čačak also has the prestigious and country's unique Fruit Research Institute located in city center zone.

For the 2017 calendar year, business enterprises in Čačak imported the goods in value of 269 million euros, and exported goods in value of 171 million euros. The coverage of imports by exports was 64%.

Economic preview
The following table gives a preview of total number of registered people employed in legal entities per their core activity (as of 2019):

Transportation

Due to its geographical position, Čačak is the main road transportation center in Western Serbia. As of August 2019, Miloš the Great motorway, which is projected to run from Belgrade to border with Montenegro, is in service from Belgrade bypass to Čačak with several other sections currently under construction. Also, the A5 motorway is planned and it will run from Čačak to Pojate, thus connecting two main motorways in Serbia. Čačak also lies on State Road 22 and State Road 23, two main highways in Western Serbia.

A railway from Kraljevo to Požega passes through Čačak, thus connecting the city with Belgrade–Bar railway (one of country's main railways). The Morava Airport, one of country's three international airports, was opened in 2019 for civil airplanes and is located between Čačak and Kraljevo.

Notable people

 Boban Dmitrović, football player
 Bora Đorđević, rock musician
 Branko Jelić, football player
 Darko Lazović, football player
 Dragan Kićanović, former basketball player and coach, Olympic, World and European champion
 Dragomir Čumić, actor
 Dragutin Gavrilović, military officer († 1945)
 Dušan Markešević, athlete
 Hadži Prodan Gligorijević, leader of the Hadži Prodan's Revolt († 1825)
 Ivan Stambolić, politician († 2000)
 Ivan Stevanović, football player
 Ivica Dragutinović, football player
 Filip Filipović, mathematician, revolutionary, first secretary of Communist party of Yugoslavia
 Filip Mladenović, football player
 Lazar Marković, football player
 Luke Black, pop singer
 Marko Lomić, football player
 Marko Marinović, basketball player
 Milan Jovanović, Montenegrin football player
 Milan Stojadinović, politician († 1961)
 Milivoje Vitakić, football player
 Miloš Minić, politician († 2003)
 Miloš Ristanović, Serbian professional footballer
 Milovan Destil Marković, artist
 Milovan Rajevac, football coach
 Miroslav Ilić, folk singer
 Mladomir Puriša Đorđević, film director and screenwriter
 Momčilo Perišić, general
 Nadežda Petrović, painter († 1915)
 Nemanja Kojić, athlete
 Serbian Patriarch Irinej, head of the Serbian Orthodox Church († 2020)
 Petar Stambolić, politician († 2007)
 Predrag Koraksić Corax, caricaturist
 Radisav Ćurčić, Serbian-Israeli basketball player, 1999 Israeli Basketball Premier League MVP
 Radmila Bakočević, soprano
 Radojko Avramović, football coach
 Radomir Mihailović Točak, rock guitarist
 Robert Kišerlovski, road bicycle racer
 Sonja Savić, actress († 2008)
 Stepa Stepanović, general from Balkan Wars and World War I († 1929)
 Stracimir Zavidović, 12th-century Serbian noble who ruled West Morava († after 1189)
 Tadija Dragićević, basketball player
 Tanasko Rajić, captain in Second Serbian Uprising († 1815)
 Tatomir Anđelić, mathematician († 1993)
 Uroš Tripković, basketball player
 Velimir Ilić, politician
 Vera Matović, folk singer
 Vlada Jovanović, basketball coach
 Vladan Vasilijević, politician and specialist in criminal law
 Vladislav Petković Dis, poet († 1917)
 Željko Obradović, former basketball player and coach, Olympic silver medalist, World, European and nine-time Euroleague champion
 Zoran Kostić (footballer), football player
 Petar Krsmanović, volleyball player, European champion

International relations

Twin towns and sister cities
Čačak is twinned with:

See also
 List of places in Serbia
 Ozon Radio

References

External links

 City of Čačak official website
 Basic information of Čačak 

 
Populated places in Moravica District
Municipalities and cities of Šumadija and Western Serbia